MASK Associates is a social business registered in Bangladesh involved in the manufacturing and export of raw jute and jute products. The company was established in 1982 by S.B. Kader, a Commercially Important Person (CIP) as declared by the Ministry of Commerce and Industry in Bangladesh. MASK Associates began its journey by representing REB Willcox of London, UK. The company currently exports raw jute and jute yarn, hessian/sacking cloth/bags, and caddies worldwide. 

A Social Business is one that is created and designed to address a social problem as a non-loss and non-dividend company.  With a company philosophy focused on addressing green issues and promoting green business through a product that is, in itself, environmentally sound, MASK Associates falls within this definition.

In 1993, Director Syed Mustaq Kader, son of S.B. Kader, took up leadership of the company and currently functions in the role of Managing Director. One of the key achievements of the company was the development of a system to clean-up oil spillages using jute during the Deepwater Horizon oil spill in 2010, a solution that was acknowledged by United States Environmental Protection Agency (EPA). 

MASK Associates is an ISO Certified Company for the standardisations ISO 9001:2015 (Quality) and ISO 14001:2015 (Environment), since 2012 and 2015. In 2018, the company received an A credit rating from Alpha Rating Limited. Recently, this rating has been upgraded to A+.

Sources
 আশরাফ আলী, তেলদূষণ থেকে সমুদ্রের জীববৈচিত্র্য রক্ষায় পরিবেশবান্ধব পাট ও পাটের দড়ি ব্যবহার, Daily Naya Diganta, 17 May 2018
 Credit Ratings, New Nation, November 15, 2018
 Mask Associates (pvt.) Ltd., Alibaba

Footnote

Manufacturing companies based in Dhaka
Jute industry of Bangladesh